The hidden-ear frog (Ranoidea cryptotis) is a species of frog in the family Hylidae. It is endemic to Australia. Its natural habitats are subtropical or tropical dry lowland grassland and intermittent freshwater marshes. It is green or dull brown coloured.

References

 

Cyclorana
Amphibians of Western Australia
Amphibians of the Northern Territory
Taxonomy articles created by Polbot
Amphibians described in 1977
Frogs of Australia
Taxobox binomials not recognized by IUCN